Ernesto, form of the name Ernest in several Romance languages, may refer to:

 Ernesto (novel) (1953), an unfinished autobiographical novel by Umberto Saba, published posthumously in 1975
 Ernesto (film), a 1979 Italian drama loosely based on the novel
 Hurricane Ernesto (disambiguation), several hurricanes or

People
Ernesto Abella, Filipino businessman, politician, and writer
Ernesto Aguero (born 1969), Cuban weightlifter
Ernesto Alonso (1917–2007), Mexican actor, director, cinematographer, and producer
Ernesto Amantegui Phumipha (born 1990), Thai footballer
Ernesto Basile (1857–1932), Italian architect
Ernesto Cesàro (1859–1906), Italian mathematician
Ernesto De Curtis (1875–1937), Italian composer
Ernesto Farías (born 1980), Argentine footballer
Ernesto Figueiredo (born 1937), also known as "Ernesto", Portuguese footballer
Ernesto Guevara de la Serna (1928–1967), also known as "El Che" or "Che Guevara"
Ernesto Geisel (1908-1996), Brazilian president
Ernesto Kohler (1849–1907), flautist and composer
Ernesto Lecuona (1895–1963), Cuban musician
Ernesto Mejía (born 1985), Venezuelan professional baseball player
Ernesto Maserati (1898–1975), Italian automotive engineer and racer
Ernesto Michel (born 1970), Argentine basketball player
Ernesto Miranda (1941–1976), American criminal
Ernesto Nathan (1848–1921), English-Italian politician
Ernesto Oglivie (born 1992), Panamaian basketball player
Ernesto Pérez d'Angelo (1932–2013), Chilean paleontologist
Ernesto Samper (born 1950), President of Colombia from 1994 to 1998
Ernesto Ruffo Appel (born 1952), American-born Mexican politician
Ernesto Rodríguez (born 1969), Argentine-Spanish volleyball player 
Ernesto Sabato (1911-2011), Argentine writer
Ernesto Valverde (born 1964), Spanish footballer and coach
Ernesto Zedillo Ponce de León (born 1951), President of Mexico from 1994 to 2000

Fictional characters
 a character in the Donizetti opera Don Pasquale
 a sphere-shaped robot in the American animated series OK K.O.! Let's Be Heroes
 a character called Uncle Ernesto in the Wizards of Waverly Place, a fantasy sitcom
 a character called Ernesto de la Cruz in the 2017 Pixar animated film Coco
 Ernesto (Better Call Saul), a fictional character in the TV series Better Call Saul

Italian masculine given names
Spanish masculine given names
Portuguese masculine given names